Chaqabal (also Romanized as Chaqābal; also known as Chaghābd) is a village in Beyranvand-e Shomali Rural District, Bayravand District, Khorramabad County, Lorestan Province, Iran. At the 2006 census, its population was 116, in 26 families.

References 

Towns and villages in Khorramabad County